Kaprassery is a village in the district of Ernakulam and is situated on the National Highway 544 (India) (Old NH47) that stretches from Salem to Kochi. It is located between the two major towns of the Indian state Kerala, namely, Aluva and Angamaly.

Overview
This village is in the state of Kerala, India. It connects the arterial roads connecting Alwaye, Angamaly, Kalady, Cochin Airport and Kanjoor.

Model Technical Higher Secondary School, Kaprassery, is situated here and forms a major landmark. Sree Krishna temple is one of the major temple in Kaprassery. Cherikkandakkavu Bhagavathy temple and Kuruvappallam Vanadurga temple are also situated here. Little Flower Church, Kaprassery was established in the year 1976 and it is in the heart of the village. Cochin International Airport is about 4 km and the Aluva Railway Station is 7 km away from Kaprassery.

Parish
Parish was established in the year 1976. It is named Little Flower Church after the Saint Therese of Lisieux (LittleFlower). 
Kaprassery celebrates its parish fiesta every first weekend of February in honour of her patroness Saint Therese of Lisieux (Little Flower) and of Saint Sebastian. This most awaited weekend is preceded by nine days evening novena and holy mass. These days, you will find the pious and devoted Kaprasserians offering their prayers, thanks giving for the blessings granted upon their family and nation by the loving God with the intercession of our Lady.
The celebration is doubly blessed and become more significant in the parish church which has been the center of the life of a Kaprasserian. By the end of ninth day, folks decorate their frontage of house and village roads with tender coconut leaves and with the plantain trunk. Soon the much awaited weekend arrives and celebration begins by hosting papal flag in front of the church and holy mass follows.

Sree Krishna Temple
Sree Krishna Temple is a temple in Kaprassery. Kaprasserians celebrate the festival of Sree Krishna as the Thiruvulsavam of Sree Krishna temple.

Onanilavu 
It is an annual cultural show that  used to be organized by Kerala Catholic Youth Movement Kaprassery Chapter (K.C.Y.M.), as a part of Onam celebrations. It was a platform for all the Kaprasserians to showcase their talents and also to be a part of delicious cultural fiesta. It is organised at Little Flower Church Parish Hall.

Transport

The nearest airport is Cochin International Airport.

Nearby railway stations include Aluva Railway Station and Angamaly Railway Station.

Kaprassery is also connected to Aluva, Angamaly, and Kalady by Kerala State Road Transportation and many privately owned transport buses.

External links

 "Incredible Kaprassery"
 "Little Flower Church"
 "Technical Higher Secondary School, Kaprassery"
 "CMC Udaya Bhavan Convent"

References 

Villages in Ernakulam district
Neighbourhoods in Kochi